Pterodon emarginatus (Portuguese: sucupira-branca) is a Brazilian legume of the Cerrado. Widely distributed in the west of Minas Gerais and in Goiás, Brazil, the fruit oil of this plant is used to deter skin penetration by Schistosome cercariae.

References

Dipterygeae
Flora of Brazil
Medicinal plants